ABC News Radio is the news radio service of ABC Audio, a division of ABC News in the United States.  Formerly known as ABC Radio News, ABC News Radio feeds, through Skyview Networks, five minute newscasts on the hour and news briefs at half-past the hour, to its network affiliates.  ABC News Radio is the largest commercial radio news organization in the US.

ABC Radio aired the first broadcast report of the assassination of President John F. Kennedy on November 22, 1963. Kennedy was shot in Dallas, Texas, at 18:30 UTC and Don Gardiner anchored the initial bulletin at 18:36:50 UTC, minutes before any other radio or television network.

History
Beginning in the late 1950s, ABC fed hourly newscasts to affiliates at 5 minutes before the hour, to contrast it with CBS Radio News and NBC Radio News, which sent its newscasts to affiliates at the top of each hour.  On January 1, 1968, the singular ABC radio network was split into four separate and distinct programming services. The American Contemporary Network, on major-market contemporary music stations like WABC New York, aired news at 5 minutes before the hour. American Information Network news ran at the top of the hour on major-market talk and information stations like KGO San Francisco. The American FM Network, carried on major-market FM stations such as WPLJ New York, aired news geared toward young adult listeners at 15 minutes past the hour, while the American Entertainment Network had news at the bottom of the hour, often carried by AM country music stations, such as WBAP in Dallas-Fort Worth.

Before the split, ABC reached an understanding with the FCC concerning the "Chain Broadcasting" rule, which forced the sale of the NBC Blue Network and enabled ABC's creation in 1943. Each of the four networks could be cleared only when no other ABC network was on the air in a particular market. Though each of the four new "networks" were distributed to all member radio stations nationally over the same broadcast-quality telephone line, the move allowed ABC to have as many as four affiliates in one city — a major competitive advantage and a dramatic turning point in the history of network radio. Two additional news networks, ABC Rock and ABC Direction, were added on January 4, 1982, after the network became a satellite-delivered service.  The network was strict in its insistence that there be no simultaneous broadcast of more than a single network in a market, except during crisis or special event coverage.

After the sale of most of ABC's radio assets to Citadel Broadcasting in 2007, the ABC Radio Network was operated by the broadcaster as part of the Citadel Media Networks division, and still distributed ABC News content. Citadel Broadcasting was later acquired by Cumulus Media.  In July 2014, Cumulus announced that it would end its partnership with ABC News, and begin a new partnership with CNN to syndicate news content via the new Westwood One News network for its stations, beginning on January 1, 2015. In turn, ABC announced that it would take the syndication of its radio content in-house under a revived ABC Radio, with distribution handled by Skyview Networks.

Despite many of ABC's former heritage radio properties no longer carrying any ABC programming, ABC affiliated with some other heritage radio stations, including WTOP-FM Washington, WLW Cincinnati, KOA Denver, KOMO Seattle, KTRS St. Louis, KSL Salt Lake City and KMBZ Kansas City. Before being acquired by Westwood One, ABC News Radio programming was available in podcast form on iHeartRadio due to Cumulus radio stations streaming on iHeart.  When Cumulus started using Westwood One/CNN for their national news, ABC News Radio's digital presence was moved exclusively to Slacker (now LiveOne) until 2020 when it was replaced with news from Associated Press.

On July 9, 2020, Westwood One made the decision to fold its news network on August 30, and  shortly thereafter, Cumulus reaffiliated most of its news/talk stations with ABC with a handful of others affiliating with other networks. While those ABC's heritage radio stations used Westwood One News as their national news provider, a few Cumulus stations formerly affiliated with ABC (example KARN-FM Little Rock) carry CBS.

Format

Of the six networks, only Information, Entertainment and ABC FM News remain as separate newscast services today, with their programming delivered via satellite.  The "Information" network newscasts clear on major-market stations.  "Entertainment" network news airs mainly on small and medium-market stations.  ABC FM News newscasts air on a small number of FM music stations.  These ABC News Radio newscasts originate from the news division's bureaus in New York, Washington and Los Angeles and air exactly at the top of the hour.  The standard format is the same for all three, with the Entertainment and FM networks having shorter stories and the Information network having slightly longer stories and more global coverage.

Individual soundbites and reporter packages are fed to stations via satellite and an affiliate website.  In addition to the top-of-the-hour newscasts, ABC News also provides its radio affiliates with headlines, briefs and "status reports" that air every ten minutes, as well as special reports, special event coverage and longform programming.

News & Comment
ABC News Radio produced News and Comment, a twice-daily long-form program hosted by broadcaster Paul Harvey, who also would read the program's commercial messages in a seamless transition. This program originated from Chicago and began its run in 1951.

On January 1, 1968, News and Comment became a part of ABC's "American Entertainment Network", although the program was also heard on stations affiliated with the other ABC Networks, if the "Entertainment" affiliate was not as powerful as another ABC affiliate in a given market. A five-minute long spin-off voiced by Harvey, The Rest of the Story, began in May 1976 and was offered to affiliates in the late afternoons, as well as on Saturday mornings.

After Paul Harvey's death on February 28, 2009, San Francisco-based broadcaster Gil Gross was appointed as the new host of News and Comment, while the Rest of the Story time slot was held by Doug Limerick.  Shortly after their appointments, however, Mike Huckabee was hired to host his own thrice-daily commentary program, The Huckabee Report, offered to stations that had been carrying both programs in the same time slots.  This program, however, was produced by the former ABC Radio Network, at that point rebranded as Citadel Media, eventually becoming Cumulus Media and finally Westwood One.  Huckabee took over distribution of the program himself as a digital-only feature in 2015.

News-talk affiliate stations

The following news-talk radio stations broadcast ABC News Radio (listed by market rank, AM unless noted)

WINS/WINS-FM – New York, NY (#1)
KFI – Los Angeles, CA (#2)
WLS – Chicago, IL (#3)
KTRH – Houston, TX (#6)
WPHT – Philadelphia, PA (#9)
WRKO – Boston, MA (#10)
KVI/KNWN (AM)/KNWN-FM – Seattle, WA (#11)
WIOD – Miami, FL (#12)
KTAR-FM – Phoenix, AZ (#13)
KOA/KHOW – Denver, CO (#18) 
KEX – Portland, OR (#22) 
WBAL – Baltimore, MD (#23)
KTRS – St. Louis, MO (#24)
KTSA – San Antonio, TX (#25)
KMET – Riverside, CA (#26)
KSL – Salt Lake City, UT (#27)
KFBK (AM)/KFBK-FM – Sacramento, CA (#28)
WDBO – Orlando, FL (#30)
WLW – Cincinnati, OH (#33)
KMBZ (AM)/KMBZ-FM – Kansas City, MO (#34)
WTAM – Cleveland, OH (#35)
WTVN – Columbus, OH (#36)
WTMJ – Milwaukee, WI (#43)
WPRO/WEAN-FM – Providence, RI (#44)
KTOK – Oklahoma City, OK (#48)
WFTL – West Palm Beach, FL (#49)
WRVA – Richmond, VA (#53)
WHAS – Louisville, KY (#55)
WBEN – Buffalo, NY (#59)
WAPI/WZRR – Birmingham, AL (#61)
KRMG (AM)/KRMG-FM – Tulsa, OK (#64)
WTKG – Grand Rapids, MI (#68)
KKOB (AM)/KKOB-FM – Albuquerque, NM (#70)
KOIL – Omaha, NE (#75)
WTMA – Charleston, SC (#78)
WILK (AM)/WILK-FM/WAAF/WODS – Scranton-Wilkes-Barre, PA (#79)
KERN – Bakersfield, CA (#80)
WMDX - Madison, WI (#81)
WLKF – Lakeland, FL (#82)
KBOI (AM)/KBOI-FM – Boise, ID (#83) 
WSKY-FM – Gainesville, FL (#84)
KRDO (AM)/KRDO-FM – Colorado Springs, CO (#87)
KXLY – Spokane, WA (#88)
WGOW (AM)/WGOW-FM – Chattanooga, TN (#94)
WHLO/WNIR – Akron, OH (#95)
KKOH – Reno, NV (#96)
WVNN (AM)/WVNN-FM – Huntsville, AL (#104)
WVLK – Lexington, KY (#106)
WJCW – Johnson City, TN (#114)
WTSN – Portsmouth, NH (#121)
WFIR – Roanoke, VA (#122)
WCOA – Pensacola, FL (#123)
KVTA – Ventura, CA (#125)
WJIM – Lansing, MI (#128)
WEEU – Reading, PA (#136)
WPIC – Youngstown, OH (#137)
WFVA – Fredericksburg, VA (#138)
WOSH – Oshkosh, WI (#139)
KTBB (AM)/KTBB-FM – Tyler, TX (#141)
WVMT – Burlington, VT (#147)
WLBY – Ann Arbor, MI (#151)
WOND – Atlantic City, NJ (#153)
KFOR – Lincoln, NE (#160)
KFYO – Lubbock, TX (#162)
KGNC – Amarillo, TX (#167)
WFTW – Fort Walton Beach, FL (#171)
KVEC – San Luis Obispo, CA (#172)
KENI – Anchorage, AK (#178)
WIMA – Lima, OH (#180)
WBSM – New Bedford, MA (#182)
WDAY – Fargo, ND (#192)
WNBF – Binghamton, NY (#193)
WTPL – Manchester, NH (#195)
WCHS – Charleston, WV (#197)
KSMA – Santa Maria, CA (#198)
KROC – Rochester, MN (#209)
KAOK – Lake Charles, LA (#210)
WJMX – Florence, SC (#214)
KLIK – Jefferson City, MO (#218)
KYYW – Abilene, TX (#226)
KBHB – Rapid City, SD (#229)
KMLB – Monroe, LA (#230)
KOEL – Waterloo-Cedar Falls, IA (#231)
KRGI – Grand Island, NE (#237)
KNOX – Grand Forks, ND (#253)
WMAY-FM – Springfield, IL (#264)
WGBW - Green Bay, WI (#292)
KFBX – Fairbanks, AK
KINY – Juneau, AK
WTBF-FM – Troy, AL
KDJI – Holbrook, AZ
WJAT – Swainsboro, GA
WVOP – Vidalia, GA
KFJB – Marshalltown, IA
WDBQ – Dubuque, IA
KVOE – Emporia, KS
WIOS – Alpena, MI
KSIS – Sedalia, MO
WKMQ – Tupelo, MS
KNPT – Newport, OR
KQEN – Roseburg, OR
WDXY – Sumter, SC
WLAK - Amery, WI
WISS - Berlin, WI
WEMJ - Laconia, NH

Correspondents
 New York: Daria Albinger, David Blaustein, Richard Cantu, Scott Goldberg, Michelle Franzen, Aaron Katersky, Brad Mielke, Cheri Preston, Mark Remillard, Chuck Sivertsen, Dave Packer, Larry Jacobs, Brian Clark, Todd Ant, Derrick Dennis, Jeff Michaels, 
 Chicago: Ryan Burrow, Mallory Vor Broker
 Dallas: Jim Ryan
 Miami: Lionel Moise
 London: Tom Rivers
 Los Angeles: Jason Nathanson, Alex Stone, Morgan Norwood, Blake Trolley
 Washington: Andy Field, Karen Travers, Em Nguyen, Alex Presha, Faith Abubey, Ike Ejiochi
 Mexico City: Conor Finnegan
 St. Louis: Kent Martin
 Orlando: Tony Marino
 Seattle: Jeff Pohjola
 San Antonio: Dennis Foley

Notable former on-air staff
 Charles Gibson – anchored the Information Network newscast; retired in 2009
 Ann Compton – White House Correspondent; retired September 10, 2014, after 41 years at the network.
 Doug Limerick – anchored the Information Network newscast weekday mornings
 Bill Downs
 Steven Portnoy – Washington Correspondent

See also
ABC News

References

External links
 

ABC News
ABC Radio Networks
Disney acquisitions
The Walt Disney Company subsidiaries
Radio stations established in 1968
1968 establishments in the United States